Rich Mosca (born c. 1948) is a former American football player and coach.  He served as the head football coach at Fairleigh Dickinson–Florham (FDU) in Florham Park, New Jersey from 2002 to 2010, compiling a record of 23–67.

Head coaching record

College

References

1940s births
Living people
Concord Mountain Lions football players
Fairleigh Dickinson–Florham Devils football coaches
Monmouth Hawks football coaches
West Liberty Hilltoppers football players
High school football coaches in New Jersey